The Lithuanian Baseball Championships (Lietuvos Beisbolo Lyga, LBL) is the men's amateur league in Lithuania. Originally the first season finished in 1922 and was organized by Steponas Darius, but the second season did not occur until 1988.

Clubs 
2014 season teams:
 Vilnius Juodasis Vikingas - Sporto Vilkai (1st)
 Kaunas Lituanica (2nd)
 BK Vilnius (3rd)
 Utena Vėtra (4th)
 BK Vilnius-2 (5th)
 Utena Vėtra-2 (6th)
 Radviliškis Bėgiai (7th)
 Rūkla Vilkas (8th)

Lithuanian Champions

References 

 
Baseball competitions in Lithuania
Baseball leagues in Europe
1922 in baseball
1988 in baseball
1922 establishments in Lithuania
1988 establishments in Lithuania